McConnellstown is a census-designated place in Walker Township, Huntingdon County, Pennsylvania, United States. Due to its long name, the village is often nicknamed "Mactown".  The population of McConnellstown was 1,194 as of the 2010 census.

Geography
The community is in central Huntingdon County, in the northeastern part of Walker Township. It is bordered to the northeast by Smithfield Township. The CDP occupies the Woodcock Valley and is bordered to the southwest and southeast by Crooked Creek, a tributary of the Juniata River.

Pennsylvania Route 26 runs the length of the community, leading northeast  to Huntingdon, the county seat, and southwest  to Marklesburg.

Demographics

General information
ZIP Code: 16660 (Only post office box addresses use it)
Area Code: 814
Local Phone Exchange: 627
School District: Huntingdon Area School District

Schools
Woodcock Valley Elementary School (closed, now home of McConnellstown Church of the Nazarene)

References

External links
McConnellstown Volunteer Fire Company
McConnellstown Playhouse

Census-designated places in Huntingdon County, Pennsylvania
Census-designated places in Pennsylvania